The Hangang Railway Bridge (Korean: 한강철교; Hanja: 漢江鐵橋) crosses the Han River in Seoul, South Korea and connects Noryangjin Station and Yongsan Station.

History
In March 1896, King Gojong of Joseon granted the American businessman James R. Morse a contract to build a railway between Chemulpo (modern-day Incheon) and Seoul. As part of the railway, construction of the bridge started in March 1897, but due to financial difficulties, Morse's venture was transferred to a Japanese consortium in May 1897. Though the initial contract stipulated the construction of a walkway for pedestrians alongside the railroad tracks, the Japanese consortium finished the construction of the bridge in July 1900 without the walkway, citing financial burden.

The construction of the Gyeongbu Line in 1905 necessitated the construction of a second railway bridge, which was finished in September 1912. A footbridge, the precursor to the Hangang Bridge, was finished in 1917. A severe flood in July 1925 necessitated repairs, including the raising of the bridge by one meter.

References

Dongjak District
Yongsan District
Railway bridges in South Korea
Bridges in Seoul
Bridges over the Han River (Korea)
Bridges completed in 1900
Rapid transit bridges
Seoul Subway Line 1